Ken Cheeseman (born December 9, 1954) is an American film, television and stage actor best known for his appearances on the Law & Order television franchise. Sometimes he is credited as Ken Chesman.

He was an acting professor at Emerson College.

Filmography

Film

Television

Theatre credits 
Classic Stage Company (2011) The Cherry Orchard as Pischik
New York Shakespeare Festival (2007) A Midsummer Night's Dream as Starveling
La MaMa Experimental Theatre Club (2006) King Lear as Fool
Classic Stage Company (1995) Amphitryon as Sosia
New York Shakespeare Festival (1993) Measure for Measure as Froth
Classic Stage Company (1993) Scapin as Sylvestre

External links
American Reperthory Theatre

American male stage actors
American male film actors
American male television actors
1954 births
Living people
Place of birth missing (living people)